Carol McNicoll (born 1943) is an English studio potter whose work is mainly decorative slipcast ware, she is credited with helping to transform the British ceramics scene in the late 1970s.

Biography 
McNicoll was born in Birmingham in 1943, and brought up in Solihull, Warwickshire (now West Midlands). She attended a foundation course at Solihull College of Technology and then studied fine art at Leeds Polytechnic from 1967 to 1970. In 1968 she made a film with three other students titled Musical which collaged and parodied existing musicals; the comedian Roy Hudd was invited to open the premiere. McNicoll was awarded a Princess of Wales Scholarship to attend Royal College of Art from 1970 to 1973, where she felt women were "marginalised" and "attention went to the men who were interested in industrial ceramics".

McNicoll worked as a wardrobe assistant at theatres in Birmingham and London in the early 1960s. In 1970 she designed costumes for Brian Eno of Roxy Music who was then her boyfriend. Her black cockerel feathered boa collar achieved an iconic status in the fledgling glamrock period. McNicoll supervised the design of the cover for Eno's Here Come the Warm Jets album with one of her teapot designs being featured on the sleeve cover. She also worked as a machinist for the fashion designer Zandra Rhodes, who in 1972 commissioned her to make a unique dinner set, consisting of pink coffee cups with hands for saucers.

McNicoll makes sculptural functional ceramics and has lectured widely including at Camberwell College of Arts from 1986 to 2000.  In 2001 she was short-listed for the Jerwood Prize for Ceramics. Recent work has been constructed from slipcast and found objects such as toy soldiers, using commercial and self made transfer decoration.

McNicoll says of her work "I am entertained by making functional objects which are both richly patterned and comment on the strange world we have created for ourselves."
She exhibits internationally and in 2003 City Gallery at Leicester, England presented a major retrospective of her work. Her work is in the V&A's modern collection.

McNicoll lives and works in a converted piano factory in Kentish Town in London, designed by her friend the architect Piers Gough in exchange for a McNicoll tea set.

Exhibitions 
Selected recent exhibitions include:
 Well meaning cultural commodities, Barrett Marsden Gallery London 2008
 Taiwan biennale exhibition curated by Moyra Elliott, 2010
 Ceramics – Carol McNicoll, Ken Eastman, Alison Britton, Clara Scremini Gallery, Paris, 2010 
 Ideal Home – Carol McNicoll, Jacqui Poncelet, Sam Scott, Marsden Woo Gallery London, 2011
 5 Divas: Carol McNicoll, Jacqui Poncelet, Janice Tchalenko, Elizabeth Fritsch, Alison Britton, Helene Aziza Paris, 2012 
 Pieces together: Carol McNicoll, Sam Scott, 1 Canada Square, Canary Wharf London, 2012

References

Further reading
 Harrod, Tanya and Roselee Goldberg.  (2003) Carol McNicoll (Craft) Lund Humphries Publishers. 
 Turner, Ralph. (1985) Carol McNicoll Ceramics Crafts Council. 
 Harrod, Tanya and Murray, Peter Carol 2000 McNicoll Knick Knacks Yorkshire Sculpture Park

External links
Carol McNicoll at the V&A

1943 births
Living people
People from Solihull
English ceramicists
English potters
Alumni of Leeds Beckett University
Alumni of the Royal College of Art
Women potters
British women ceramicists